Dick and Jane are the two main characters created by Zerna Sharp for a series of basal readers written by William S. Gray to teach children to read. The characters first appeared in the Elson-Gray Readers in 1930 and continued in a subsequent series of books through the final version in 1965. These readers were used in classrooms in the United States and in other English-speaking countries for nearly four decades, reaching the height of their popularity in the 1950s, when 80 percent of first-grade students in the United States used them. Although the Dick and Jane series of primers continued to be sold until 1973 and remained in use in some classrooms throughout the 1970s, they were replaced with other reading texts by the 1980s and gradually disappeared from school curricula. The Dick and Jane series were known for their simple narrative text and watercolor illustrations. Despite the criticisms of the stereotypical content that depicted white, middle-class Americans and the whole-word (look-say) method of teaching reading on which these readers are based, the characters of "Dick", "Jane", and their younger sister, "Sally", became household words. The Dick and Jane primers have also become icons of mid-century American culture and collectors' items.

Origins
The predecessors to the Dick and Jane primers were the phonics-based McGuffey Readers, which were popular from the mid-nineteenth to the mid-twentieth century, and the Elson Basic Readers. William Scott Gray (1885–1960), director of the Curriculum Foundation Series at Scott, Foresman and Company and dean of the University of Chicago's college of education, co-authored with William H. Elson the Elson Basic Readers (renamed the Elson-Gray Basic Readers in 1936), which Scott Foresman published in Chicago, Illinois. Gray's research focused on methods to improve reading instruction using content that would be of interest children and develop their word-recognition skills. Gray's vision was to tie "subject area" books in health, science, social studies, and arithmetic (each discipline having its own series of graded texts also published by Scott Foresman) with the vocabulary mastered in the basic readers, thus vastly improving readability in these same areas.

Zerna Sharp, a former teacher, came up with the idea for what became the Dick and Jane readers for elementary school children while working as a reading consultant and textbook editor for Scott Foresman. She worked with Gray to develop the readers after noting the reduced reading ability of children and urged the use of a new reading format for primers. In addition, Sharp developed the main characters of "Dick" and "Jane", the older brother and sister in a fictional family that included "Mother", "Father", and a younger sister named "Sally", their pets, "Spot" (originally a cat in the 1930s, but a dog in later editions), and "Puff", their cat; and a toy teddy bear named "Tim". Sharp named the characters, selected and edited the storylines from ideas that others submitted, and supervised production of the books. Gray and others wrote the Dick and Jane stories; illustrator Eleanor B. Campbell did most of the early illustrations.

"Dick" and "Jane" originally appeared in Elson-Gray Readers in 1930. Before the appearance of the first Dick and Jane stories, reading primers "generally included Bible stories or fairy tales with complicated language and few pictures." After the Elson-Gray series ended in 1940, the characters continued in a subsequent series of primary readers that were later revised and enlarged into newer editions. The Dick and Jane readers were widely used in classrooms in the United States and in other English-speaking countries for nearly four decades and reached the height of their popularity in the 1950s, when 80 percent of first-grade students in the United States were learning to read though these stories. The 1965 edition, the last of the Dick and Jane series, introduced the first Black family as characters in a first-grade reader. Although the Dick and Jane series of primers continued to be sold until 1973 they remained in use in some classrooms throughout the 1970s. By the 1980s, the Dick and Jane stories had been replaced with other reading texts and gradually disappeared from schools curriculum.

Content and illustrations
William Gray and Zerna Sharp worked together to develop readers that incorporated the whole-word or look-say method of word recognition (also called sight reading). The Dick and Jane primers introduced new readers to one new word on each page and only five new words in each individual story. Gray and Sharp also wanted children who read the books to be able to readily identify with the characters. Sharp chose stories where the characters participated in typical children's activities.

The Dick and Jane primers taught reading as well as American middle-class values to school-aged children. The storylines described the lives and experiences of a stereotypical American middle-class, white family in their suburban home. "Father" wore a suit, worked in an office, mowed the lawn, and washed the car. "Mother" stayed at home, did housework, and raised the children. "Dick", the oldest of the family's three children, was active and well-behaved; "Jane", the second oldest child, was pretty and carefree. She also helped care for "Sally", the baby of the family.

The texts and illustrations for the Dick and Jane primers were intended to work together to help young readers understand the story. The texts introduced a repetitive pattern of words; the illustrations provided visual reinforcements to help convey the meaning of the words. The simple but distinctive illustrations for the books were done by artists Eleanor Campbell and Keith Ward. Robert Childress did the illustrations during the 1950s. Richard Wiley took over the illustrations in the 1960s. The Dick and Jane beginning readers became well known for their simple narrative text and watercolor illustrations. Because the primers were intended for nationwide distribution, the text and illustrations intentionally lacked references to specific regional geographical features such as mountains, rivers, lakes, plains, or the seashore.

Books published in the series
 Grade 1 – Before We Read, We Look and See, We Work and Play, We Come and Go, Guess Who, Fun with Dick and Jane, Go, Go, Go, and Our New Friends
 Grade 2 – Friends and Neighbors and More Friends and Neighbors
 Grade 3 – Streets and Roads, More Streets and Roads, Roads to Follow, and More Roads to Follow
 Transitional 3/4 – Just Imagine
 Grade 4 – Times and Places 
 Grade 5 – Days and Deeds
 Grade 6 – People and Progress
 Grade 7 – Paths and Pathfinders; Parades
 Grade 8 – Wonders and Workers; Panoramas
 Grade 9 – Helpful in Ways

In the mid-1950s, the texts for grades four, five, and six were split into two books for each grade level, as was originally the pattern with the lower grades in the series. The naming pattern for this group of books added the words "The New" at the beginning of the title for the first book in each grade level and the word "More" to the beginning of the title for the second book in each grade level to form new titles: The New Times and Places and More Times and Places; The New Days and Deeds and More Days and Deeds; and The New People and Progress and More People and Progress.

In the late 1950s, the texts for grades seven and eight were re-packaged into a Basic Reading and Literature series consisting of Book 1 (for seventh grade) and Book 2 (for eighth grade) without changing any of the contents from the original late 1940s versions. As an alternative to this more literary approach for these two grades, entirely new texts were published with shorter, simpler readings with the titles of Parades and More Parades for the seventh grade and Panoramas and More Panoramas for the eighth grade. Focusing on targeted reading and word attack techniques, a soft-cover workbook, Basic Reading Skills, was published for the junior high (seventh and/or eighth grade) and intended to be used independently, similar to the Think And Do books were used in conjunction with the graded texts at the elementary school level.

Scott Foresman made changes in their readers in the 1960s in an effort to keep the stories relevant, updating the series every five years. Scott Foresman published Wide Wide World in 1960 for the seventh grade; it included longer literary selections from authors such as Nathaniel Hawthorne, Emily Dickinson, and Rudyard Kipling.

In the mid-1960s, Scott Foresman's New New Basic Readers were heavily revised. The books had a larger page size, new and updated artwork, some shortened stories from previous editions, and a large portion of new stories. In addition, the "Dick", "Jane", and "Sally" characters were a bit older and a bit more sophisticated. Teaching procedures also were slightly different: the vocabulary control was looser and more phonics training was added. Helen M. Robinson became the head author. The earliest titles, released in 1962, were: We Read Pictures, We Read More Pictures, Before We Read, Sally Dick and Jane, Fun With Our Family, Fun Wherever We Are, Guess Who, Fun With Our Friends, More Fun With Our Friends (all Grade 1); Friends Old and New and More Friends Old and New (grade 2); Roads to Follow and More Roads to Follow (grade 3); Ventures (grade 4); Vistas (grade 5); Cavalcades (grade 6); Dimensions (grade 7); and Challenges (grade 8).

In 1965, Scott Foresman became the first publisher to introduce an African American family as characters in a first-grade reader series. The family included two parents and their three children: a son, "Mike", and twin daughters, "Pam" and "Penny". In the multi-ethnic edition, the titles of the 1st and 2nd pre-primers were changed to Now We Read and Fun With the Family to reflect the addition of an African-American family. Other books in the series retained the 1962 titles. In addition, the 1965 edition books were available in two covers: one cover featured characters as in previous books; the other cover, which many people refer to as a "fingerpaint" cover, was listed in the Scott, Foresman catalog a "child-art" and did not feature any characters. The Think-and-Do Book workbooks, which began as Silent Reading Workbooks with the Elson readers if the 1930s, were part of the 1950s and the 1960s editions of the updated readers. An experimental Initial Teaching Alphabet version was launched with the multi-ethnic series in the 1960s as well.

In 1967, two years after Scott Foresman retired the Dick and Jane series, the company launched its Open Highways series, which included heavily illustrated classic children's stories and poems, as well as placing greater emphasis on multicultural content and phonics training in its subsequent readers. Wide Horizons, a compansion series for advanced readers, was introduced as well. Initially, the readers for grades one through seven were indicated as "Book 1", "Book 2", and so on, but later editions for each grade-level reader had its own title in the series, such as Ready to Roll and Rolling Along (the Open Highways books for the first grade): Moving Ahead and More Power for the second grade' and Splendid Journey and Speeding Away books for the third grade.

Adaptations
The Dick and Jane readers inspired other publishers to adopt a similar format, but Scott Foresman's Dick and Jane series were the market leaders until the early 1960s, 
In Catholic editions of the 1940s, 1950s, and 1960s series, the "Sally", "Dick", and "Jane" characters were renamed "Judy", "John", and "Jean" to reflect the names of Catholic saints. Another series, published by Ginn and Company, featured characters named "David" and "Ann". Groups of stories in each book were replaced by Catholic-oriented stories of the saints or portrayed moral choices. Some 1960s grade-level readers also had Seventh-day Adventist versions that used the 1965 multi-ethnic characters with revised book title. For example, Now We Read became Friends to Know and Fun Wherever We Are became Places to Know. W. J. Gage published British English language versions in Canada with appropriate spelling changes. In lower grades French language versions also were issued in the 1950s in Canada, with the main characters renamed Jeanne, Paul, and Lise in these editions, as well as British English versions in paperback in the United Kingdom.

Teaching methodology
For three decades (roughly 1940 to 1970), the whole-word or look-say method (also called sight reading) on which the Dick and Jane readers were based remained the dominant reading method in American schools. Phonics-based reading methods came into fashion in the 1970s. The whole-language movement developed in the 1980s. Other methods were also in use for shorter periods before they were replaced as well. The look-say method used a controlled vocabulary and taught readers to memorize the words through repetition, placing less emphasis on teaching phonics Texts in the Dick and Jane readers repeated words within phrases such as "Oh, see. Oh, see Jane. Funny, funny Jane." Teacher's guides accompanying the texts also encouraged adoption of the whole-word (look-say) method of identifying the meaning of words from the illustrations and repeating words introduced in the text.

For this reason, the Dick and Jane readers came to be used less and less as studies supported systematic phonics as a more effective method of developing foundational literacy skills.

Criticisms
According to the history of the Institute for Juvenile Research, psychologist Marion Monroe developed methods for early childhood reading programs, which led to the Dick and Jane stories.

Impact on students
For decades, critics and advocates continued to debate the impact of the sight reading method and the primers that used it. Dr. Samuel T. Orton, a neuropathologist, warned educators in his article published in the February 1929 issue of the Journal of Educational Psychology that the look-say method would lead to reading disability. In Why Johnny Can't Read (1955), author Rudolf Flesch concluded that the whole-word (look-say) method was ineffective because it lacked phonics training. In addition, Flesch was critical of the simple stories and limited text and vocabulary in the Dick-and-Jane-style readers that taught students to read through word memorization. Flesch and other critics also believed that the look-say method did not properly prepare students to read more complex materials in the upper grade levels. Arther Trace also criticized the Dick and Jane series in his book, Reading Without Dick and Jane (1965). In 2002, author Samuel L. Blumenfeld, a supporter of teaching reading skills with phonics reading, argued that the Dick and Jane series and others that used the whole-word, look-say, or sight-reading method caused poor reading skills among the millions of American students who learned to read using this method. Harold Henderson asserted in his book, Let's Kill Dick and Jane (2006), that the series focused on trivial aspects of reading and left children far behind their peers in Europe.

Bias and stereotypes
In the late 1950s and early 1960s, critics of the Dick and Jane readers began to point out its stereotypes; class, gender, and racial bias; and errors in content and illustrations. Critics objected to the Dick and Jane storylines and stereotyped roles, arguing that "many students could not relate to family with two children, a dog named Spot, and a cat named Puff." Increasing social changes, including the civil rights movement in the 1960s and efforts to include a stronger presentation of other races and cultures in classroom texts, made the white, middle-class characters of "Dick and Jane seem increasingly irrelevant to some." Zerna Sharp, who created the characters and edited the readers countered the harsh criticisms with the reply, "That's all an adult's viewpoint."

Although the Dick and Jane primers were already declining in popularity by the mid-1960s, critics continued to attack the look-say method and the content of the readers, especially their gender stereotypes (i.e., the mother staying at home to take care of the children and keep house, while the father went to work, along with passive female characters such as Jane) and lack of racial and cultural diversity.

Collectibles and reprint editions
The primers that made the characters of "Dick", "Jane", and "Sally" household words have become icons of mid-century American culture, as well as collectors' items. First editions of the books sell for as much as US$200. 
Grosset & Dunlap, an imprint of Penguin Group, reissued the books in 2003, and over 2.5 million copies were sold, but the publishers warned against using them to teach reading to children. Related merchandise, such as shirts and magnets, also gained wide popularity, particularly among people who had never been exposed to the original series, but were familiar with catchphrases such as "See Spot run!".

In popular culture

Advertising and branding
See Jane Work is a line of organizational products at Office Depot designed by Holly Bohn; the inspiration for the name comes from the character Jane.
Many Target commercials featuring Target Dog included the phrase "See Spot save", a take on of the series' famous "See Spot run".

Cartoons
In a Calvin and Hobbes cartoon Calvin wrote a book report titled, "The Dynamics of Interbeing and Monological Imperatives in Dick and Jane: A Study in Psychic Transrelational Gender Modes".
A Sunday Issue also has him read the "See Spot Run" story as a homework assignment.

Films
Fun with Dick and Jane (1977) and its 2005 remake refers to Fun with Dick and Jane, the title of the Grade 1 book in the reading series.
One sequence of Disney's animated feature film Tarzan (1999) that is set to music features a book with a page that says, "See Jane, See Jane Run."
 The title of See Spot Run is based on a line in the books.

Literature
Marc Gallant's illustrated parody book, More Fun with Dick and Jane (1986), shows the characters as grown-ups.
An excerpt of a Dick and Jane text is used in the opening chapter of Nobel Prize-winner Toni Morrison's novel, The Bluest Eye, and the text is repeated with variations throughout the book; its idyllic white suburban setting is juxtaposed with that of a black family during the Great Depression.

Music
The band Human Sexual Response referenced the characters and style of the books in the song "Dick and Jane", from their EP Fig. 14 (1980).
The band Hawaiian Pups spoofed the characters in the song "Baby Judy", from their EP Split Second Precision (1983).
Musician JG Thirlwell has a song called "See Dick Run", recorded under his Foetus alias, which references the two titular characters.

Television
A PBS children's television series called Between the Lions does a spoof of the books entitled Fun with Chicken Jane.
Singer Bobby Vinton recorded a song in the 1970s entitled "Dick and Jane".
In The Simpsons episode "They Saved Lisa's Brain", the Comic Book Guy's T-shirt reads "C:/DOS C:/DOS/RUN RUN/DOS/RUN", similar to the catch phrases in the book series.
Third Rock from the Suns season 1 finale episode is titled "See Dick Run" and the two-part season 3 opening episode is titled "Fun with Dick and Janet"; many of the show's episode titles have various references, with the names of the show's characters added in.

Public exhibitions
The Dick and Jane readers were featured in an exhibition at Lakeview Museum of Arts and Sciences in Peoria, Illinois, in 1994 and at the Richmond Public Library in Richmond, Indiana, in 1997.

See also

 Alice and Jerry
 Ant and Bee
 Janet and John
 Janet and Mark
 Key Words Reading Scheme's Peter and Jane
 McGuffey Readers
 Mr. Mugs
 Science Research Associates
 Why Johnny Can't Read

References

Further reading

External links
An article in USA Today.

Learning to read
Reading (process)
Basal readers
Series of children's books
Early childhood education
Early childhood education in the United States